Events from the year 1534 in art.

Events
 Michelangelo begins work on the fresco The Last Judgment to be painted  on the altar wall of the Sistine Chapel

Works

 Hans Sebald Beham – Scenes from the Life of David
 Corneille de Lyon – Portrait of a Man
 Lorenzo Lotto – Annunciation
 Bernard van Orley – Altarpiece of Calvary (Church of Our Lady, Bruges)

Births
December 16, Hans Bol, Flemish painter (died 1593)
 Lucas de Heere, Flemish Portrait painting, poet and writer (died 1584)
 Dirck Barendsz, Dutch painter who was born and died in Amsterdam (died 1592)

Deaths
March 5 - Antonio da Correggio, painter of the Parma school of the Italian Renaissance (born 1489)
probable - Marcantonio Raimondi, Italian engraver (born 1480)

External links

 
Years of the 16th century in art